Japan competed at the 1976 Winter Paralympics in Örnsköldsvik, Sweden. 1 competitor from Japan won 0 medals and finished 10th in the medal table.

Alpine skiing 

Sadami Fukasawa competed at the Men's Slalom I event and finished in 5th place out of 15 competitors.

See also 

 Japan at the Paralympics
 Japan at the 1976 Winter Olympics

References 

1976
1976 in Japanese sport
Nations at the 1976 Winter Paralympics